Chris Jones (November 11, 1958 – September 13, 2005) was an American singer and guitarist who worked mainly in Europe, having moved to Germany after he joined the United States Army. He often recorded with the German audiophile label Stockfisch Records.

Biography 
Christopher Paul Jones was born in Reno, Nevada. At the age of five, he began playing the guitar. A few years later, he decided to become a professional musician, and when he was 11 years old, he was admitted to a program at the Peabody Conservatory of Music in Baltimore, Maryland. There he discovered Johann Sebastian Bach, to whom he dedicated his student composition "Sonata in D", and for which Jones was awarded the conservatory's "Young Composer of the Year" award.

Shortly thereafter, he discovered the blues and started listening to Robert Johnson, James Taylor, and Little Feat.

In 1976, Jones joined the U.S. Army and was stationed in Adenine's, Germany. During this time, the foundation for his musical career in Europe was laid. Over the following decades, he played guitar on albums of artists such as Sara K., Allan Taylor, and Reinhard Mey. He toured and recorded solo and with the blues harmonica musician Steve Baker.

In August 2005, Jones was diagnosed with Hodgkin's lymphoma in an advanced stage. He died on September 13, 2005 in Northeim, Germany. Many friends and other musicians helped him, either personally or by staging charity concerts to help with his expenses.

Music 
Jones' repertoire encompassed various musical styles, among them blues, country, folk, and rock and roll, much of which was published on Stockfisch Records label.

Selected discography

Solo 
 1983 No Looking Back
 1995 The Dreaming Pool
 1998 Free Man
 2000 Moonstruck
 2003 Roadhouses and Automobiles

with Steve Baker 
 1995 Slow Roll
 1996 Everybody's Crying Mercy
 2003 Smoke and Noise
 2005 Gotta Look Up

with Kieran Halpin 
 1995 Glory Dayz
 2002 Moving Air
 2002 Back Smiling Again
 2004 The Roundtower Sessions
 2005 A Box of Words and Tunes

with Reinhard Mey 
 2002 Rüm Hart
 2004 Nanga Parbat

with Sara K. 
 2002 Waterfalls
 2002 Live in Concert: Are We There Yet?
 2006 Hell or High Water

with Steve Strauss 
2005 Just Like Love

Early works (with various musicians) 
 1979 Friends and Charlie
 1980 Night Shift
 1980 Getting Your Own Back
 1993 Mr. Bluesman (soundtrack)

See also 
 Sara K.
 Stockfisch Records

References

External links 
Memorial page of the "bluenote eV"

Chris Jones on Stockfisch Records

1958 births
2005 deaths
Deaths from cancer in Germany
Deaths from Hodgkin lymphoma
20th-century classical composers
American blues guitarists
American male guitarists
Songwriters from Nevada
American expatriates in Germany
Musicians from Reno, Nevada
American male classical composers
20th-century American guitarists
Guitarists from Nevada
20th-century American composers
20th-century American male musicians
Stockfisch Records artists
American male songwriters